Poughkeepsie (YTB-813) was a United States Navy  named for Poughkeepsie, New York.

Construction

The contract for Poughkeepsie was awarded 22 June 1970. She was laid down on 16 February 1971 at Sturgeon Bay, Wisconsin, by Peterson Builders and launched 23 July 1971.

Operational history
Delivered to the Navy 27 November 1971, Poughkeepsie was assigned to duties in the San Francisco Bay area.  In the mid-1990s, she was transferred to Naval Station Pearl Harbor, Hawaii.

Stricken from the Navy List 26 April 2006, ex-Poughkeepsie was sold by Defense Reutilization and Marketing Service (DRMS) 27 February 2008.

References

External links
 

 

Natick-class large harbor tugs
Ships built by Peterson Builders
1971 ships